Robert Vincent Radlosky (born January 7, 1974) is former Major League Baseball pitcher. Radlosky played for the Minnesota Twins in the  season.

He was drafted by the Twins in the 22nd round of the 1993 amateur draft.

External links

Major League Baseball pitchers
Minnesota Twins players
1974 births
Living people
Baseball players from Florida
Fort Myers Miracle players
Gulf Coast Twins players
New Britain Rock Cats players
Salt Lake Buzz players
Trenton Thunder players
Junior college baseball players in the United States